ISAC may refer to:

internet Speech Audio Codec (as "iSAC"), a wideband speech codec
Institute for the Study of American Cultures, a defunct organization devoted to the study of pre-Columbian contact between the Old and New Worlds
 Information Sharing and Analysis Center, a cybersecurity non-profit organization
Indian Space Research Organisation Satellite Centre, the lead ISRO centre for technology testing and spacecraft assembly integration in India
Immune stimulating antibody conjugate, a monoclonal antibody 
Idol Star Athletics Championships, Korean biannual Athletics gathering

People 
Isac, variant spelling of Isaac (name)
Emil Isac (1886–1954), Romanian poet, dramatist, short story writer and critic
Isac Ludo (1894–1973), Romanian writer and political figure
Isac Peltz (1899–1980), Romanian prose writer and journalist

Other 
 Vadul lui Isac is a village in Cahul District, Moldova
 the Isac is a French river in the Loire-Atlantique department